Natun Batabari is a village in Kamrup rural district, situated in Rani, Kamrup.The village is located on the Rabha Hasong Autonomous Council area as well as the Assam Meghalaya border.

Transport
The village is accessible through National Highway 37 and connected to nearby towns and cities with regular buses and other modes of transportation.

References

Villages in Kamrup district